Hiwaga ng Kambat is a 2019 Philippine drama television series starring Edward Barber and Grae Fernandez. The series premiered on ABS-CBN's Yes! Weekend from April 21 to August 25, 2019, succeeding the two-decade run of Wansapanataym.

Series overview

Episodes

Season 1 (2019)

References

Lists of Philippine drama television series episodes